Anniella campi, also known as the Southern Sierra legless lizard is a species of legless lizard found in California, specifically in the Sierra Nevada It was previously known as Anniella pulchra. It has double dark lateral stripes.

References

Anniella
Reptiles described in 2013
Lizards of North America
Fauna of California
Taxa named by Theodore Johnstone Papenfuss